The 2021–22 Armenian First League season was the 30th since its establishment. The season began 5 August 2021 and finished 19 May 2022.

Stadiums and locations

League table

Statistics

Top scorers
.

References

External links

Armenian First League seasons
Armenia
1